The American Journal of Ancient History (often abbreviated AJAH) is a peer-reviewed academic journal covering ancient history and classical studies. It was established in 1976 at Harvard University and is published by Gorgias Press. The journal is abstracted and indexed by L'Année philologique. The editor-in-chief is T. Corey Brennan (Rutgers University).

References

External links 
 

Classics journals
Publications established in 1976
English-language journals